Collabieae is a tribe of orchids in the subfamily Epidendroideae.

See also 
 Taxonomy of the Orchidaceae

References

External links 

 
Epidendroideae tribes